FTN may refer to:

 Former British Ftn (TV channel)
 FemTechNet, a website
 First Temperate Neolithic
 Franja Transversal del Norte, a region of Guatemala
 Fratton railway station, in England
 Fulton (Amtrak station), in Kentucky, US